Kyzyl Oktyabr (Qıźıl Oktyabr) is a rural locality (a village) in Kuzyanovsky Selsoviet, Ishimbaysky District, Bashkortostan, Russia. The population was 40 as of 2010. There is 1 street.

Geography 
Kyzyl Oktyabr is located 47 km northeast of Ishimbay (the district's administrative centre) by road. Iksisyakovo is the nearest rural locality.

References 

Rural localities in Ishimbaysky District